Mandrill Is is the second album by the Brooklyn-based soul/funk band Mandrill. Released in April 1972 on Polydor Records, the album peaked at No. 24 on the Top Soul Albums chart.

Track listing 
All songs written and arranged by Mandrill

"Ape Is High" 	5:32 	
"Cohello" 	1:50 	
"Git It All" 	4:30 	
"Children of the Sun" 	5:00 	
"I Refuse To Smile" 	4:05 	
"Universal Rhythms" 	3:24 	
"Lord of the Golden Baboon" 	3:33 	
"Central Park" 	4:05 	
"Kofijahm" 	3:25 	
"Here Today Gone Tomorrow" 	4:30 	
"The Sun Must Go Down" 	3:17

Personnel 
Carlos Wilson - trombone, alto saxophone, flute, guitar, percussion, vocals
Louis Wilson - percussion, trumpet, flugelhorn, vocals
Ricardo Wilson - tenor saxophone, percussion, vocals
Claude "Coffee" Cave - keyboards, vibraphone, percussion, vocals
Frederick "Fudgie Kae" Solomon - bass, percussion, vocals
Omar Mesa - guitar, percussion, vocals
Charles Padro - drums, percussion, vocals

Charts

Singles

References

External links
 Mandrill-Mandrill Is at Discogs

1972 albums
Mandrill (band) albums
Polydor Records albums